Middletown is a passenger railway station for New Jersey Transit's North Jersey Coast Line in Middletown Township, Monmouth County, New Jersey. Located along both sides of Church Street in Middletown, the station is the only active station within the township.

History 

The station was constructed as part of the New York and Long Branch Railroad, a subsidiary of the Central Railroad of New Jersey and the Pennsylvania Railroad. The site of the current Middletown station was part a farm owned by the Conover family. In 1875, the Conovers sold some of their land for $100 to build the railroad through the area. A new station was built in 1876 for the passenger service. 

After years of neglect, the station was repainted and rehabilitated in 1964 with attendance by descendants of the Conovers. The high-level platforms were constructed in 1988 with the beginning of electric service down to Long Branch from South Amboy. The former depot stands at the edge of the parking lot on Conover Avenue.

Station layout
The station has two tracks, and two high-level side platforms that are eight cars long. The station has 1,616 parking spaces in two lots.

References

External links

 Station from Church Street from Google Maps Street View
 Former station from Railroad Avenue from Google Maps Street View

Middletown Township, New Jersey
Railway stations in Monmouth County, New Jersey
NJ Transit Rail Operations stations
Stations on the North Jersey Coast Line
Railway stations in the United States opened in 1875
Former New York and Long Branch Railroad stations
1875 establishments in New Jersey